In 1999, the British Film Institute surveyed 1,000 people from the world of British film and television to produce a list of the greatest British films of the 20th century. Voters were asked to choose up to 100 films that were "culturally British".

List breakdown
 The 1960s head the list with 26 films of merit for the decade.  Four films made the list from each of the years 1949, 1963, and 1996.  The earliest film selected was The 39 Steps (1935), and only two other 1930s films made the list.
 David Lean, with six films (including four of the top eleven), is the most-represented director in the list, followed by Michael Powell (five films, of which four were collaborations with Emeric Pressburger). Powell and Pressburger ("The Archers") and John Schlesinger had four films each, while Alexander Mackendrick and Tony Richardson each had three. Seven of the films were produced by Ealing Studios during the years 1949–55.
 The most represented actor is Alec Guinness, with nine films, three being in supporting roles. Michael Caine is the most represented living actor, starring in seven films.
 Julie Christie is the most represented actress, with six films on the list.

Full list

See also
 Time Out 100 best British films
 Films considered the greatest ever
 BFI TV 100 – a list of the best British television programmes
 AFI's 100 Years...100 Movies
CIFF Top 100 Egyptian films
 100 Italian films to be saved
 In 2004 the BFI compiled a list of the 100 biggest UK cinematic hits of all time based on audience viewing, the list was released as a book. The top 10 are available in this BBC News Online story.

References

Lists of British films
Top film lists
Top 100 British films
1999 in film
1999 in British cinema

de:British Film Institute#BFI Top 100